South Asian English is the English accent of South Asia, inherited from British English dialect. Also known as British-Indian English in the British Raj, the English language was introduced to the Indian subcontinent in the early 17th century and reinforced by the long rule of the British Empire. Today it is spoken as a second language by about 350 million people, 20% of the total population.

Although it is fairly homogeneous across the region, sharing "linguistic features and tendencies at virtually all linguistic levels", there are also differences based on various factors.

South Asian English is sometimes called "Indian English", as British India included most of the region, but today, the varieties of English are officially divided according to the modern states:

Bangladeshi English
Bhutanese English
Indian English
Maldivian English
Nepali English
Pakistani English
Sri Lankan English

Notes

References
 .
 Braj Kachru, Yamuna Kachru, Cecil Nelson, The Handbook of World Englishes, 2009, .

Languages of South Asia
Dialects of English